Greatest Hits: Straight Up! is the third greatest hits album by American singer Paula Abdul. It was released on May 8, 2007 by Virgin Records. 

The album contains all of Abdul's singles from her three studio albums, including the singles "Will You Marry Me?" and "Ain't Never Gonna Give You Up" which were left off Greatest Hits (2000). Greatest Hits: Straight Up! did not chart on the US Billboard 200 but reached number 86 on the Top R&B/Hip Hop Albums chart and number 78 in Mexico.

Track listing

Charts

References

Paula Abdul compilation albums
2007 greatest hits albums
Virgin Records compilation albums